Surgical shock is the shock to the circulation resulting from surgery.  It is commonly due to a loss of blood which results in insufficient blood volume.

References

Causes of death
Intensive care medicine
Medical emergencies